The Midnight Prowlers is a 1915 American silent comedy film produced by the Vim Comedy Company featuring Oliver Hardy.

Cast
 Bobby Burns as Pokes
 Walter Stull as Jabbs
 Ethel Marie Burton as Female Detective (as Ethel Burton)
 Edna Reynolds as Mrs. Jabbs
 Oliver Hardy (as Babe Hardy)
 Frank Hanson
 Billy Ruge

See also
 List of American films of 1915
 Oliver Hardy filmography

External links

1915 films
1915 short films
American silent short films
American black-and-white films
1915 comedy films
Silent American comedy films
American comedy short films
1910s American films